Anactoria (or Anaktoria) is the name of a woman mentioned by poet Sappho as a lover of hers in Sappho's Fragment 16 (Lobel-Page edition) , often referred to by the title "To an Army Wife, in Sardis". Sappho 31 is traditionally called the "Ode to Anactoria", though no name appears in it (A. C. Swinburne, quoted in Lipking 1988). 

Algernon Charles Swinburne wrote a long poem in Poems and Ballads titled Anactoria, in which Sappho addresses Anactoria in a long monologue written in pentameter with rhyming couplets. The poem created a sensation amongst contemporary readers by openly approaching hitherto taboo topics such as Lesbianism and dystheism. Swinburne's Sappho is heavily inspired by Milton's Satan and John Donne's poem, also on Sappho.

References
 

7th-century BC Greek women
6th-century BC Greek women
Sexuality in ancient Greece
British poems
Female characters in literature